Ksenia Alexeevna Konkina (born 5 July 2001) is a Russian former competitive ice dancer. With her former skating partner, Pavel Drozd, she is the 2019 CS Asian Open Trophy and 2019 CS Warsaw Cup silver medalist.

Personal life 
Ksenia Alexeevna Konkina was born on 5 July 2001 in Krasnogorsk, Russia.

Career

Early career 
Konkina began skating in 2005. Early in her career, she competed with Georgy Reviya. Konkina/Reviya placed fourth at 2015 JGP United States and won two junior international medals, at the 2015 Lake Placid Ice Dance International and 2015 Tallinn Trophy.

2016–2017 season 
Konkina teamed up with Grigory Yakushev in 2016 and won silver at the 2016 Tallinn Trophy. They placed fifth at the 2017 Russian Championships.

2017–2018 season 
Konkina/Yakushev were assigned to their first Junior Grand Prix events. They won silver at 2017 JGP Austria and bronze at 2017 JGP Croatia. Konkina/Yakushev placed sixth at the 2018 Russian Championships.

2018–2019 season 
Konkina teamed up with Alexander Vakhnov ahead of the season and moved to train with him under Svetlana Liapina in Moscow. They won bronze in their only international competition, 2018 JGP Canada, together.

Pavel Drozd announced that he was teaming up with Konkina in November 2018. She moved to Alexander Zhulin's group to train with him. Konkina/Drozd made their international debut at the 2019 Open Ice Mall Cup, where they won the bronze medal.

2019–2020 season 
Konkina/Drozd opened their season by winning the gold medal at 2019 NRW Trophy in Dortmund, Germany. They then won silver at the 2019 CS Asian Open Trophy behind Christina Carreira / Anthony Ponomarenko of the United States. Konkina/Drozd again won silver at 2019 CS Warsaw Cup, behind France's Marie-Jade Lauriault / Romain Le Gac.

2020–2021 season 
Konkina/Drozd were scheduled to make their Grand Prix debut at the 2020 Rostelecom Cup, but withdrew. The team split later in the season. Their coach, Alexander Zhulin, announced that Konkina had contracted an unspecified serious illness and its effect on her health prevented her from continuing her career.

Programs

With Drozd

With Vakhnov

With Yakushev

With Reviya

Competitive highlights 
GP: Grand Prix; CS: Challenger Series; JGP: Junior Grand Prix

With Drozd

With Vakhnov

With Yakushev

With Reviya

Detailed results 
Small medals for short and free programs awarded only at ISU Championships.

With Drozd

With Vakhnov

With Yakushev

With Reviya

References

External links 
 
 
 
 

2001 births
Living people
Russian female ice dancers
People from Krasnogorsk, Moscow Oblast